Alphonse Joseph  is a given name. Notable people with the name include:
 Alphonse Joseph Georges (1875-1951), French army officer
 Alphonse Joseph Glorieux (1844–1917), Belgian missionary Roman Catholic bishop

See also 
 Alphonse (disambiguation)

Compound given names
French masculine given names